Florica is a common Romanian feminine given name. Notable people with the name include:

 Florica Bagdasar (1901–1978), Romanian neuropsychiatrist, first woman minister in Romania at the Ministry of Health
 Florica Bucur (born 1959), Romanian rower
 Florica Grecescu (born  1932), Romanian middle-distance runner 
 Florica Lavric (1962–2014), Romanian rower
 Florica Leonida (born 1987), Romanian artistic gymnast
 Florica Musicescu (1887–1969), Romanian pianist and musical pedagogue
 Florica Petcu-Dospinescu (born 1951), Romanian rower
 Florica Prevenda (born 1959), Romanian artist
 Florica Silaghi (born 1957), Romanian rower
 Florica Topârceanu (born 1954), Romanian biologist and Antarctic researcher
 Florica Vulpeș (born 1982), Romanian sprint canoer

Less common is the masculine form of the name, Florică; this given name may refer to:
 Florică Murariu (1955–1989), Romanian rugby union player

See also
 Florica (disambiguation)

Romanian feminine given names